Zhukovka is a rural locality (a village) in Muromtsevskoye Rural Settlement, Sudogodsky District, Vladimir Oblast, Russia. The population was 16 as of 2010.

Geography 
Zhukovka is located on the Sudogda River, 10 km south of Sudogda (the district's administrative centre) by road. Rayki is the nearest rural locality.

References 

Rural localities in Sudogodsky District